Golinski may refer to the following:

People
Heinz Golinski (1919–1942), German military pilot
Marian Goliński (1949–2009), Polish politician
Matt Golinski (b. 1972), Australian chef
Michał Goliński (b. 1981), Polish footballer for Warta Poznań

Other
Golinski v. Office of Personnel Management, a U.S. court case

Origin
The name originates from Poland.